The following is a list of notable deaths in June 2014.

Entries for each day are listed alphabetically by surname. A typical entry lists information in the following sequence:
Name, age, country of citizenship and reason for notability, established cause of death, reference.

June 2014

1
Salvador Anzelmo, 93, American lawyer and politician, member of the Louisiana House of Representatives (1960–1972).
Liliana Leah Archibald, 86, English insurance broker, ruptured aortic aneurysm.
Andres Briner, 91, Swiss music historian, academic and art journalist.
Chang Feng-hsu, 85, Taiwanese politician, Pingtung County Magistrate (1964–1973), Mayor of Taipei (1972–1976), Minister of the Interior (1976–1978).
John Edwards Conway, 79, American senior and chief judge (District of New Mexico), and federal judge (FISA Court).
Ann B. Davis, 88, American actress (The Bob Cummings Show, The Brady Bunch), Emmy winner (1958, 1959), subdural hematoma from a fall.
Dolfi Drimer, 79, Romanian chess player and engineer.
Brian Farmer, 80, English footballer.
Heinrich Fasching, 85, Austrian Roman Catholic prelate, Auxiliary Bishop of Sankt Pölten (1993–2004).
Karlheinz Hackl, 65, Austrian actor (Sophie's Choice), malignant brain tumor.
John Hills, 53, British jockey and horse trainer, pancreatic cancer.
Yuri Kochiyama, 93, American internment camp detainee and civil rights activist.
Dhondutai Kulkarni, 86, Indian Jaipur-Atrauli gharana singer, recipient of the Sangeet Natak Akademi Award (1990).
Juhani Laakso, 72, Finnish Olympic shooter.
Jay Lake, 49, American author (Mainspring), colorectal cancer.
Valentin Mankin, 75, Ukrainian Soviet sailor, Olympic triple champion (1968, 1972, 1980) and silver medalist (1976), cancer.
Lawrence G. Miller, 78, American politician, member of the Connecticut House of Representatives (since 1991).
Tarō Naka, 92, Japanese poet, pneumonia.
Joseph Olita, 70, Kenyan actor (Rise and Fall of Idi Amin, Mississippi Masala), hypertension.
Antonio Rada, 77, Colombian World Cup footballer (1962), cancer.
Tom Rounds, 77, American radio production executive (American Top 40), complications from surgery.
Gholamreza Khosravi Savadjani, Iranian political prisoner, executed.
Jack Souther, 90, Canadian volcanologist.
Sir Hugo White, 74, British Navy officer, Governor of Gibraltar (1995–1997), Admiral and Commander-in-Chief Fleet (1992–1995).

2
Ramona Brooks, 63, American singer, cancer.
Ivica Brzić, 73, Serbian football player (FK Željezničar Sarajevo, FK Vojvodina) and manager (CA Osasuna, RCD Mallorca, Alianza Lima).
Max Charlesworth, 88, Australian philosopher.
Anjan Das, 62, Indian National Film Award-winning filmmaker (Faltu), liver cancer.
Ernie Eiffler, 88, Australian football player (Collingwood).
Donald Flores, 65, Northern Marianan politician, Mayor of Saipan (since 2010), stroke.
Anatol Grinţescu, 74, Romanian Olympic water polo player.
Gennadi Gusarov, 77, Russian footballer.
James Keegstra, 80, Canadian teacher and politician.
James E. Keller, 71, American judge, member of the Kentucky Supreme Court (1999–2005), cancer.
Nikolay Khrenkov, 29, Russian Olympic bobsledder (2014), traffic collision.
Phạm Huỳnh Tam Lang, 72, Vietnamese football player and manager, stroke.
Duraisamy Simon Lourdusamy, 90, Indian Roman Catholic prelate, Cardinal of Santa Maria (since 1985), Archbishop of Bangalore (1968–1971).
Maciej Łukaszczyk, 80, Polish pianist.
Weldon Myrick, 76, American steel guitar player (The Nashville A-Team, Area Code 615).
Mame Reiley, 61, American political strategist, cancer.
Kuaima Riruako, 79, Namibian chieftain, Paramount Chief of the Herero (since 1978), Hereroland Political Representative to South Africa (1978–1980), hypertension.
Alexander Shulgin, 88, American pharmacologist and chemist, MDMA pioneer, liver cancer.
Tapan Sikdar, 69, Indian politician, MP for Dum Dum (1998–2004), kidney failure.
Marjorie Stapp, 92, American actress (My Three Sons, Dragnet).

3
Myles Ambrose, 87, American prosecutor and civil servant, commissioner for Customs and Border Patrol, heart failure.
S. D. Bandaranayake, 96, Sri Lankan politician.
Svyatoslav Belza, 72, Russian music and literary critic.
Gordon Bennett, 59, Australian artist.
Alan Callan, British businessman, record producer and music executive. (death announced on this date)
Roy M. Goodman, 84, American politician, member of the New York Senate (1969–2002), respiratory failure.
Sir Eldon Griffiths, 89, British politician, MP for Bury St Edmunds (1964–1992), Minister for Sport (1970–1974).
Karl Harris, 34, English motorcycle racer, race collision.
Elodie Lauten, 63, French-born American composer.
André Lochon, 81, French Olympic water polo player.
Virginia Luque, 86, Argentine singer and actress.
Kaneyasu Marutani, 94, Japanese politician, member of the House of Councillors (1977–1989).
Basheer Mauladad, 82–83, Kenyan Asian leader. (death announced on this date)
Narendra Patni, 71, Indian chief executive, founded Patni Computer Systems, heart attack.
Gopinath Munde, 64, Indian politician, Minister of Rural Development (2014), MP (since 2009), Maharashtra MLA, DCM and Minister of Home Affairs, traffic collision.
Fritz Schwegler, 79, German artist and academic.
James Alan Shelton, 53, American bluegrass guitarist (Ralph Stanley), cancer.

4
Neal Arden, 104, British actor.
Joseph Befe Ateba, 52, Cameroonian Roman Catholic prelate, Bishop of Kribi (since 2008).
John Baker, 86, British Anglican prelate, Bishop of Salisbury (1982–1993).
Don Banfield, 97, Australian politician, Attorney-General of South Australia (1979).
Waldemar Beck, 93, German Olympic rower.
Tom Coleman, 85, American politician, member of the Georgia State Senate (1981–1995).
George Ho, 94, American-born Chinese Hong Kong media owner (Commercial Television and Radio), recipient of the Gold Bauhinia Star (2001).
A. Walton Litz, 84, American literary historian.
Doc Neeson, 67, Australian musician (The Angels), malignant brain tumour.
Ed Negre, 86, American race-car driver and owner (NASCAR, Dale Earnhardt).
Chester Nez, 93, American Navajo code talker, last remaining Navajo who developed the code, recipient of the Congressional Gold Medal (2001), renal failure.
William Schuelein, 86, American politician, member of the Oklahoma Senate (1972–1992).
Cliff Severn, 88, British-born American cricketer (national team) and child actor (A Christmas Carol, How Green Was My Valley).
Nathan Shamuyarira, 85, Zimbabwean newspaper editor and politician, Minister of Information (1980–1987) and Foreign Affairs (1987–1995), chest infection.
Edward Sövik, 95, American architect and author.
Sydney Templeman, Baron Templeman, 94, British judge and law lord.
Martin Treacy, 78, Irish hurler (Kilkenny).
Otto van Verschuer, 86, Dutch baron, estate manager and politician, member of the States of Gelderland (1962–1978) and Executive (1965–1978).
Buddy Wentworth, 77, Namibian politician, recipient of the Ordre des Palmes Académiques, heart disease.
Walter Winkler, 71, Polish footballer (Polonia Bytom, national team).
Don Zimmer, 83, American baseball player (Brooklyn Dodgers) and manager (Boston Red Sox, Chicago Cubs), heart failure as a complication from cardiac surgery.

5
Bob Abrahamian, 35, American disc jockey and record collector, suicide.
Abu Abdulrahman al-Bilawi, 42–43, Iraqi ISIL military commander.
Maria Alquilar, 86, American ceramic artist.
Édouard Mwe di Malila Apenela, 76, Congolese businessman.
Hans Baars-Lindner, 88, German Olympic sailor (1960).
Ganiyu Akanbi Bello, 83, Nigerian community leader and businessman, murdered.
Nina Byers, 84, American physicist.
Christopher Burger, 78, South African cricketer.
Don Davis, 75, American musician, songwriter (Who's Making Love, Disco Lady) and Grammy Award-winning producer (You Don't Have to Be a Star).
Rolf Hachmann, 96, German archaeologist.
Robert Kuwałek, 47, Polish historian.
Johnny Leach, 91, British table tennis player, World Table Tennis Champion (1949, 1951), team champion (1953), President of the ETTA.
Ismael Betancourt Lebron, 83, Puerto Rican police officer.
Hana Orgoníková, 67, Czech politician, MP for the CSDP (since 1989).
Aaron Sachs, 90, American jazz musician.
Reiulf Steen, 80, Norwegian politician and diplomat, Minister of Transportation (1971–1972) and Commerce (1979–1981), MP for Oslo and Akershus (1977–1993), Ambassador to Chile (1992–1996).

6
Irene Awret, 93, German artist, author and Holocaust survivor.
Darío Barrio, 41, Spanish television chef, BASE jumping accident.
Douglas Bartles-Smith, 77, English Anglican priest, Archdeacon of Southwark (1985–2004).
Ado Bayero, 83, Nigerian chieftain, politician and diplomat, Emir of Kano (since 1963), Northern Region MLA, Ambassador to Senegal, cancer.
Alejandro Antonio Buccolini, 84, Argentine Roman Catholic prelate, Bishop of Río Gallegos (1992–2005).
Tap Canutt, 81, American stunt performer and actor.
Joyce Mitchell Cook, 80, American philosopher.
Karen DeCrow, 76, American civil rights activist, lawyer and author, President of the National Organization for Women (1974–1977), melanoma.
Alain Desaever, 61, Belgian cyclist.
Mary Ellen Epps, 79, American politician.
Eric Hill, 86, British children's writer and illustrator (Spot the Dog).
Lee Hyla, 61, American composer.
David Lockwood, 85, British sociologist.
Brian Miller, 93, Australian politician, member of the Tasmanian Legislative Council (1957–1986).
Sheldon Roberts, 87, American metallurgist.
Jerrold Schwaber, 67, American cell biologist.
Alexander E. Shilov, 84, Russian chemist.
Lorna Wing, 85, British psychiatrist, co-founder of the National Autistic Society, coined the term "Asperger syndrome".

7
Dora Akunyili, 59, Nigerian politician and academic, Federal Minister of Information and Communications (2008–2010), ovarian cancer.
Leonard Bawtree, 90, Canadian politician.
Natalia E. Bazhanova, 67, Russian orientalist.
Eugene Cotran, 75, English judge.
Alan Douglas, 82, American record producer (Jimi Hendrix) and sound engineer (Eric Clapton).
Dick Elliott, 78, American politician, member of the South Carolina House of Representatives (1982–1992) and Senate (1992–2012).
Kevin Elyot, 62, British scriptwriter (Clapham Junction) and playwright (My Night with Reg).
Fernandão, 36, Brazilian footballer (Sport Club Internacional, national team), helicopter crash.
E. W. Foy, 77, American basketball coach (Southeastern Louisiana Lions, McNeese State Cowboys).
Glenn Freeman, 80, American politician, member of the Kentucky House of Representatives (1970–1971, 1974–1977) and Senate (1996–2000).
Jurij Gustinčič, 92, Slovene journalist and writer.
Marjorie Haines, 85, American Olympic equestrian.
Anthony Herbert, 84, American army officer and whistleblower.
Jacques Herlin, 86, French character actor (Of Gods and Men).
Melvin Irvin, 72, American politician, member of the Louisiana House of Representatives (1983–1987), cancer.
Jónas Kristjánsson, 90, Icelandic academic and novelist.
Rafael A. Lecuona, 86, Cuban Olympic gymnast (1948, 1952, 1956) and American academic.
Juan María Leonardi Villasmil, 67, Venezuelan Roman Catholic prelate, Bishop of Punto Fijo (since 1997).
Roger Mayne, 85, English photographer.
Epainette Mbeki, 98, South African anti-apartheid activist.
James McNair, 62, American writer and comedian, traffic collision.
Stephen A. Metcalf, 86, British missionary.
Helcio Milito, 83, Brazilian musician.
Pierre Patry, 80, Canadian filmmaker.
Ida Schöpfer, 84, Swiss Olympic alpine skier.
Clara Schroth, 93, American gymnast, Olympic bronze medalist (1948).
Uday Singh, 75, Fijian politician.
Merv Thackeray, 88, Australian politician, member of the Queensland Legislative Assembly for Keppel (1957–1960) and Rockhampton North (1960–1972).
Anna-Teresa Tymieniecka, 91, Polish-born American philosopher.
David Tyshler, 86, Russian Soviet Olympic fencer (1956) and academic.
Norman Willis, 81, British trade unionist, General Secretary of the TUC (1984–1993).

8
Ruy Barbosa Popolizio, 94, Chilean businessman, oenologist and cathedratic, Minister of Agriculture (1963–1964), Rector of the University of Chile (1968–1969).
John Bartlett, 85, English cricketer.
Aman Ullah Chowdhury, Bangladeshi politician.
Jan Deberitz, 64, Norwegian novelist.
Ken Doubleday, 88, Australian Olympic hurdler and triple jumper (1952, 1956).
Hans Kristian Eriksen, 81, Norwegian non-fiction writer, magazine editor, novelist and short story writer.
Jean Geissinger, 79, American baseball player (AAGPBL).
Alexander Imich, 111, Russian Congress Poland-born American chemist, parapsychologist and supercentenarian, oldest man in the world.
Eva Kløvstad, 92, Norwegian World War II resistance member (Milorg).
Veronica Lazăr, 76, Romanian-born Italian actress (Inferno, Last Tango in Paris, The Stendhal Syndrome).
Dennis Lewiston, 80, British cinematographer (The Rocky Horror Picture Show).
Harold Russell Maddock, 96, Australian jockey.
Shirley Marsh, 88, American politician, member of the Nebraska Legislature (1973–1989).
J. Stanley Marshall, 91, American educator, President of Florida State University (1969–1976), complications from a heart attack.
Billy McCool, 69, American baseball player (Cincinnati Reds).
J. William Pope, 76, American politician and lawyer, member of the Tennessee House of Representatives, cancer.
Celio Roncancio, 48, Colombian cyclist.
Ivo Vinco, 86, Italian opera singer.
Ben Whitaker, 79, British politician and global poverty campaigner, MP for Hampstead (1966–1970).
Prince Katsura, 66, Japanese royal, acute heart failure.

9
Bernard Agré, 88, Ivorian Roman Catholic prelate, Cardinal of San Giovanni (since 2001), Archbishop of Abidjan (1994–2006).
Danilo Baroni, 92, Argentine lawyer and politician, Governor of Chaco (1987–1991).
Tapan Barua, Indian cricketer.
Harris Blake, 84, American politician, member of the North Carolina Senate (2003–2013), natural causes.
William A. Bradfield, 86, New Zealand astronomer.
Allan Brown, 89, Australian football player (Collingwood).
John Ferguson Browne, 93, Canadian politician, MP for Vancouver-Kingsway (1958–1962).
Edmund Bruggmann, 71, Swiss alpine skier, Olympic silver medalist (1972), complications from leukemia.
Alison Burton, 92, Australian tennis player.
Rex L. Carter, 88, American politician, member of the South Carolina House of Representatives (1953–1980) and Speaker (1973–1980).
Robert Cranston, 85, Indian Olympic boxer.
Junie Donlavey, 90, American Hall of Fame NASCAR team owner (Ken Schrader, Jody Ridley, Donlavey Racing), Alzheimer's disease.
Marit Svarva Henriksen, 89, Norwegian politician.
Reinhard Höppner, 65, German politician, Minister-President of Saxony-Anhalt (1994–2002), cancer.
Kim Heungsou, 94, Japanese Korean-born South Korean harmonism artist.
Rik Mayall, 56, English comedian, writer and actor (The Young Ones, Drop Dead Fred, Bottom), cardiac arrest.
Bosse Persson, 72, Swedish eccentric and political figure, founder of the Donald Duck Party.
Elsie Quarterman, 103, American plant ecologist.
Vitaly Shafranov, 84, Russian theoretical physicist.
Alicemarie Huber Stotler, 72, American senior judge, member (1984–2009) and Chief Judge (2005–2009) of the US District Court for Central California.
Gustave Tassell, 88, American fashion designer, complications from Alzheimer's disease.
Bob Welch, 57, American baseball player (Los Angeles Dodgers, Oakland Athletics), Cy Young Award winner (1990), accidental fall.
Gerd Zacher, 84, German composer and author.

10
Toribio Aguilera, 73, Honduran economist and politician, MP for Cortés (1998–2014), lymphatic cancer.
Kamaluddin Ahmed, 75, Pakistani physicist, hepatitis.
Sebastián Alabanda, 63, Spanish footballer (Real Betis), heart attack.
Marcello Alencar, 88, Brazilian politician and lawyer, Governor of Rio de Janeiro (1995–1999), Mayor of Rio de Janeiro (1983–1986, 1989–1993).
Robert Arthur Alexie, 56, Canadian Gwich'in politician and novelist, Chief (1989–1991), President of the Tribal Council, chief First Nations negotiator during 1992 land reform.
Frank Asaro, 86, American chemist.
Albert Baernstein II, 73, American mathematician.
Gabrielle Blunt, 95, British actress.
Vladimir Derer, 94, British politician, founder of the Campaign for Labour Party Democracy.
Jay Disharoon, 65, American politician, member of the Mississippi House of Representatives (1976–1980) and Senate (1980–1988), traffic collision.
Julio García Estrada, 90, Mexican lawyer and academic.
Gary Gilmour, 62, Australian Test cricketer.
Robert M. Grant, 96, American theologian.
Jim Hazelton, 82, Australian aviator, prostate cancer.
Ian Horrocks, British RAF officer.
Jack Lee, 94, American politician and radio broadcaster, Mayor of Fayetteville, North Carolina (1971–1975), chairman of the North Carolina Republican Party.
Walter Lemos, 84, Argentine Olympic runner.
Khair Bakhsh Marri, 86, Pakistani Baloch nationalist leader and militant, leader of the BLA, complications from a brain haemorrhage.
Gerald N. McAllister, 91, American Episcopal prelate, Bishop of Oklahoma (1977–1989).
William Pannill, 87, American daffodil hybridizer, president of the American Horticultural Society.
Vithal Patil, 86, Indian cricketer.
Peder I. Ramsrud, 91, Norwegian politician.
Stuart Vaughan, 88, American theatre director, prostate cancer.
Alex Wedderspoon, 83, British Anglican priest, Dean of Guildford (1987–2001).
Vital João Geraldo Wilderink, 82, Dutch-born Brazilian Roman Catholic prelate, Bishop of Itaguaí (1980–1998).
Jack Woolf, 90, American educator, President of the University of Texas at Arlington (1959–1968).
Kin Maung Yin, 76, Burmese artist.

11
Horaţiu Badiţă, 37, Romanian Olympic swimmer.
Joe Becker, 82, American Olympic cyclist (1956).
Michael Brown, 93, American songwriter.
Ruby Dee, 91, American award-winning actress (Decoration Day, American Gangster) and civil rights activist, National Medal of Arts laureate (1995).
Rafael Frühbeck de Burgos, 80, Spanish conductor and composer, cancer.
Charles Gautier, 69, French politician, Senator for Loire-Atlantique (2001–2011), colon cancer.
Claude Horan, 96, American ceramic, glass artist and surfer, coined the term "Steamer Lane".
Susan B. Horwitz, 59, American computer scientist, stomach cancer.
Dan Knott, 95, Australian rules footballer (Collingwood, Richmond).
Mipham Chokyi Lodro, 61, Chinese Tibetan Buddhist teacher, 14th Shamarpa of the Karma Kagyu sect, heart attack.
Juan López Hita, 69, Spanish footballer (Algeciras, Sevilla).
Keshav Malik, 89, Indian poet and critic.
Benjamin Mophatlane, 41, South African information technology executive, CEO of Business Connexion Group (since 2007), cardiac arrest.
Haobam Ongbi Ngangbi Devi, 89, Indian classical dancer and musician.
Gilles Ségal, 82, French actor and playwright.
Harilal Shah, 71, Kenyan cricket player (East Africa) and manager (national team), Captain (1975).
Carlton Sherwood, 67, American soldier, journalist (1980 Pulitzer Prize team at Gannett) and filmmaker (Stolen Honor), heart failure.
Ernest Tursunov, 78, Kyrgyzstani poet and translator.

12
Richard Arnowitt, 86, American physicist.
Don Bennett, 80, English cricket player and coach (Middlesex).
Lilian Benningsen, 89, Austrian operatic mezzo-soprano and contralto.
Gabriel Bernal, 58, Mexican boxer, WBC Flyweight Champion (1984).
Horacio Cordero, 68, Argentine painter, sculptor and ceramicist.
Predhuman K Joseph Dhar, Indian author, social worker and a writer.
Nabil Hemani, 34, Algerian footballer (JS Kabylie, ES Sétif, national team), fall.
Dan Jacobson, 85, South African writer and academic.
Kefee, 34, Nigerian gospel singer, lung failure.
Julian Koenig, 93, American advertising copywriter.
Carla Laemmle, 104, American actress (The Phantom of the Opera, The Broadway Melody, Dracula), natural causes.
Gunnel Linde, 89, Swedish author.
Donald Macaulay, Baron Macaulay of Bragar, 80, British politician and life peer.
Khagen Mahanta, 71, Indian folk singer, cardiac ailment.
Enzo Pastor, 32, Filipino race-car driver, shot.
Joe Pittman, 60, American baseball player (Houston Astros, San Diego Padres).
Shaktipada Rajguru, 92, Indian Bengali language writer.
Pat Rosier, 72, New Zealand writer.
Frank Schirrmacher, 54, German journalist, writer and newspaper publisher (Frankfurter Allgemeine Zeitung), heart attack.
Jimmy Scott, 88, American jazz singer.
Willie Sheelor, 86, American Negro league baseball player.
Paul Silva, 91, American biologist.
Gerald Westbury, 86, English surgeon.
Yoo Byung-eun, 73, Japanese-born South Korean religious leader and businessman. (body found on this date)

13
Robin Amis, 82, British author, poet, publisher, editor and translator.
Mark Ballinger, 65, American baseball player (Cleveland Indians).
António Silva Cardoso, 86, Angolan politician.
Neville Charlton, 85, Australian rugby league footballer.
Michael Coetzee, 54, South African anti-apartheid activist and civil servant, cancer.
Mahdi Elmandjra, 81, Moroccan economist and futurologist.
Gyula Grosics, 88, Hungarian football player (Tatabánya, Budapest Honvéd, national team) and manager, Olympic champion (1952).
Willie Harvey, 84, Scottish footballer (Kilmarnock).
John Michael Ingram, 83, British fashion designer.
Abdallah Kamal, 49, Egyptian newspaper journalist, editor, author and politician, MP, heart attack.
Jim Keays, 67, Australian rock musician (The Masters Apprentices), pneumonia as a complication of multiple myeloma.
David MacLennan, 65, Scottish actor and theatre producer, founded 7:84, motor neurone disease.
Chuck Noll, 82, American football player (Cleveland Browns) and Hall of Fame coach (Pittsburgh Steelers), most coached Super Bowl wins (IX, X, XIII, XIV), natural causes.
Robert Peters, 89, American poet, playwright, editor and stage actor, natural causes.
Richard Rockefeller, 65, American billionaire physician, plane crash.
Jack Roeser, 90, American engineer, manufacturing executive and political activist.
Sara Widén, 33, Swedish opera singer (Royal Swedish Opera), cancer.

14
Bob Campbell, 83, English wildlife photographer.
Alberto Cañas Escalante, 94, Costa Rican writer, journalist and politician, MP for San José (1962–1966, 1994–1998), complications following surgery.
Alex Chandre de Oliveira, 36, Brazilian footballer (Hangzhou Greentown), heart attack.
Ernie Cheatham, 84, American officer and football player.
Isabelle Collin Dufresne, 78, French-born American actress (I, a Man), artist, author and model (Andy Warhol), cancer.
Irene Forbes, 65, Cuban Olympic fencer (1972).
Magdolna Gulyás, 64, Hungarian Olympic basketball player.
Ágnes Gajdos-Hubai, 66, Hungarian Olympic volleyball player.
José Gómez, 70, Spanish Olympic cyclist (1968).
John Geoffrey Jones, 85, British judge.
Sam Kelly, 70, British actor ('Allo 'Allo!, Porridge), cancer.
Robert Lebeck, 85, German photojournalist.
Steve London, 83, American television and film actor and attorney.
Francis Matthews, 86, English film and television actor (Captain Scarlet and the Mysterons, Paul Temple, Heartbeat).
Jamie McEwan, 61, American Olympic bronze medallist slalom canoeist (1972).
Ivor Mendonca, 79, Guyanese cricketer (West Indies), throat and prostate cancer.
Terry Richards, 81, British actor and stuntman (Raiders of the Lost Ark, Tomorrow Never Dies, The Princess Bride).
James E. Rogers, 75, American educator and media owner (KSNV-DT, IWCC), Chancellor of Nevada System of Higher Education (2005–2009), cancer.
Telangana Shakuntala, 63, Indian film and stage actress, cardiac arrest.
Seymour Slive, 93, American art historian.
Rodney Thomas, 41, American football player (Texas A&M Aggies, Tennessee Titans), heart attack.
Maria Wonenburger, 86, Spanish mathematician.

15
Fathia al-Assal, 81, Egyptian playwright and activist.
Jacques Bergerac, 87, French actor (Les Girls).
Giancarlo Danova, 75, Italian footballer.
Nalini Prava Deka, 70, Indian author.
Larry Dupree, 70, American football player, heart attack.
Ray Fox, 98, American Hall of Fame NASCAR engine builder and team owner (Junior Johnson, Cale Yarborough), pneumonia.
Fazlul Karim, 89, Pakistani-Bangladeshi politician, political prisoner, academic and literary translator, member of the CAP, multiple organ failure.
Casey Kasem, 82, American radio disc jockey (American Top 40) and voice actor (Scooby-Doo, Super Friends), Lewy body dementia.
Daniel Keyes, 86, American author (Flowers for Algernon), complications from pneumonia.
Andrei Kharlov, 45, Russian chess grandmaster.
Kutho, 61, Burmese comedian and film director.
John G. King, 88, English-born American physicist and professor (MIT), heart and renal failure.
Maury Meyers, 82, American politician, Mayor of Beaumont, Texas (1978–1982, 1986–1990), Parkinson's disease.
Olavi Nikkilä, 92, Finnish politician.
Nick Nostro, 83, Italian film director.
Petrus Oellibrandt, 78, Belgian racing cyclist.
Olli Partanen, 91, Finnish discus thrower.
Emile Riachi, 87, Lebanese orthopaedic surgeon.
Moise Safra, 79, Syrian-born Brazilian billionaire financier, founder and chairman of Banco Safra, Parkinson's disease.

16
Charles Barsotti, 80, American cartoonist (The New Yorker), brain cancer.
Plácido Bilbao, 73, Spanish footballer.
Pierre D'Archambeau, 87, Belgian-born American violinist.
Carol Kreeger Davidson, 85, American sculptor.
Yvonne Dold-Samplonius, 77, Dutch mathematician and historian.
Tony Gwynn, 54, American Hall of Fame baseball player (San Diego Padres), salivary gland cancer.
Thore Heramb, 97, Norwegian painter and illustrator.
Liselotte Marti, 58, Swiss Olympic gymnast.
Maria Perosino, 52, Italian author and art historian, tumor.
J. M. Rajaratnam, 86, Sri Lankan accountant and executive (Singer Corporation).
Cándido Muatetema Rivas, 54, Equatoguinean politician and diplomat, Prime Minister (2001–2004), Ambassador to Germany (since 2005).
Thérèse Vanier, 91, British doctor.

17
Yury Bayakovsky, 76, Soviet and Russian scientist.
Asher Ben-Natan, 93, Austrian-born Israeli diplomat, Director General of the Ministry of Defense (1959–1965), Ambassador to Germany (1965–1970) and France (1970–1974).
Haig Bosmajian, 86, American writer.
Patsy Byrne, 80, English actress (Blackadder II).
Éric Dewailly, 59, Canadian medical researcher, landslide.
Wolfram Dorn, 89, German politician.
Paul England, 85, Australian race car driver.
Ray Evans, 74, Australian business executive and political activist, co-founder of the Lavoisier Group.
Anthony Goldschmidt, 71, American graphic designer and poster artist (E.T. the Extra Terrestrial, The Dark Knight, Cocoon), liver cancer.
Igor Korneluyk, 37, Russian state television correspondent, mortar strike.
Mario Llamas, 86, Mexican tennis player.
Stanley Marsh 3, 76, American artist and philanthropist, patron of Cadillac Ranch.
John McClure, 84, American Grammy Award-winning record producer.
Barry Moss, 74, American film casting director (Friday the 13th, Beavis and Butt-head Do America, The Cosby Show), heart failure.
Peter J. Notaro, 79, American judge, member of the New York Supreme Court (1991–2005), stroke.
Arnold S. Relman, 91, American physician, editor (New England Journal of Medicine) and health care activist, melanoma.
Jorge Romo, 90, Mexican footballer (national team).
Rodrigo Ruiz, 84, Costa Rican Olympic sports shooter.
Anton Voloshin, 25–26, Russian sound engineer, motor strike.
Jeffry Wickham, 80, British actor (The Remains of the Day, Scoop, Ali G Indahouse).
Larry Zeidel, 86, Canadian hockey player (Detroit Red Wings, Chicago Blackhawks, Philadelphia Flyers), complications from heart failure and kidney problems.

18
David Cobb, 93, British marine artist.
Leo De Maeyer, 86, Belgian physical chemist.
Lynn DeJac, 50, American exonerated prisoner, cancer.
Rezaul Bari Dina, 62, Bangladeshi politician.
Sergei Dolgov, 59, Ukrainian-Russian journalist, murdered.
Michael Frederick, 87, Barbadian cricketer.
John Ruthell Henry, 63, American serial killer, execution by lethal injection.
Stephanie Kwolek, 90, American chemist, inventor of Kevlar.
Johnny Mann, 85, American composer, Grammy Award-winning arranger ("Up, Up and Away") and singer (Alvin and the Chipmunks).
Claire Martin, 100, Canadian author.
Itche Menahem, 74–75, Israeli football player and manager.
John E. Miller, 85, American politician, member (1958–1998) and Speaker (1979–1980) of the Arkansas House of Representatives.
Márcio Moreira, 67, Brazilian advertising executive, complications from heart surgery.
James Nelson, 82, American sound editor (Five Easy Pieces, The Exorcist) and film producer (Star Wars).
Vladimir Popovkin, 56, Russian military officer, head of the Federal Space Agency (2011–2013).
Ces Renwick, 89, New Zealand cricketer.
Horace Silver, 85, American jazz pianist (Song for My Father, Blowin' the Blues Away), natural causes.
Luraine Tansey, 96, American slide librarian.

19
Tahira Asif, 52–53, Pakistani politician, member of the National Assembly (#52 Reserved Women's Sindh seat), shot.
Oskar-Hubert Dennhardt, 98, German army and air force officer, World War II Wehrmacht major awarded Knight's Cross with Oak Leaves, general in the Bundeswehr.
Gerry Goffin, 75, American Hall of Fame lyricist ("Will You Love Me Tomorrow", "The Loco-Motion", "Go Away Little Girl", "Take Good Care of My Baby").
Charlotte Greig, 59, British novelist and singer.
Shrenik Kasturbhai Lalbhai, 88, Indian industrialist.
James A. Lantz, 92, American politician, member of the Ohio House of Representatives, Speaker (1959–1961).
Alan Moller, 64, American meteorologist and tornado chaser, Alzheimer's disease.
Daniel Nazareth, 66, Indian composer and conductor.
James Pitts, 93, American chemist, academic and civil servant, natural causes.
William Reid, 87, Scottish military historian.
Bill Renna, 89, American baseball player (New York Yankees, Boston Red Sox, Philadelphia Athletics/Kansas City Athletics).
John Schiffer, 68, American politician, member of the Wyoming Senate (since 1993), liver cancer.
Avraham Shalom, 86, Austrian-born Israeli security official, Director of the Shin Bet (1980–1986), commander in the capture of Adolf Eichmann and the Bus 300 affair.
Ibrahim Touré, 28, Ivorian footballer (Misr El-Makasa SC, Al-Safa' SC), cancer.
Guy Trottier, 73, Canadian ice hockey player (New York Rangers, Toronto Maple Leafs), cancer.

20
Anne Arnold, 89, American sculptor.
Jim Bamber, 66, British cartoonist, cancer.
David Brown, 84, British musicologist.
Oberdan Cattani, 95, Brazilian footballer (Sociedade Esportiva Palmeiras).
Nev Cottrell, 87, Australian rugby union player.
Handel Greville, 92, Welsh rugby union player (national team).
Philip Hollom, 102, British ornithologist.
Florica Lavric, 52, Romanian rower, Olympic champion (1984), cancer.
Amalia Miranzo, 74, Spanish politician, Senator for Cuenca (1977–1986).
Norman Sheffield, 75, British rock drummer (The Hunters), recording facility co-owner (Trident Studios) and manager (Queen), cancer.
Murat Sökmenoğlu, 69, Turkish politician, MP for Hatay Province (1983–1989) and Istanbul (1999–2002).
Jaroslav Walter, 75, Czech ice hockey player (national team), Olympic bronze medalist (1964).

21
Tritobia Hayes Benjamin, 69, American art historian and educator.
Gerry Conlon, 60, Northern Irish author and human rights activist, Guildford Four member wrongfully convicted of the Guildford pub bombings, lung cancer.
Reb Chaim Daskal, 53, Israeli religious figure.
Peter de Rome, 89, American filmmaker (Adam & Yves), natural causes.
Robert Gardner, 88, American anthropologist and documentary filmmaker.
John Heslop, 89, New Zealand surgeon and sports administrator.
Roland Hill, 93, German-born British journalist and biographer.
Yozo Ishikawa, 88, Japanese politician, Director General of the Defense Agency, member of the House of Representatives for Tokyo, acute respiratory failure.
Anthony Jacobs, Baron Jacobs, 82, British peer and automobile executive, Chairman of the BSM (1973–1990).
Walter Kieber, 83, Liechtenstein politician, Prime Minister (1974–1978).
Roman Laskowski, 78, Polish academic.
Standish Lawder, 78, American film director.
Doreen Miller, Baroness Miller of Hendon, 81, British politician and life peer.
Rose Marie Muraro, 83, Brazilian sociologist.
Sir Philip Myers, 83, British police officer, Chief Constable of North Wales Police (1974–1982).
Jimmy C. Newman, 86, American country music singer, cancer.
Irajá Damiani Pinto, 94, Brazilian paleontologist.
Aleksandr Shadrin, 25, Uzbekistani footballer, gastric ulcer.
Bob Soleau, 73, American football player (Pittsburgh Steelers).
Wong Ho Leng, 54, Malaysian politician, MP for Sibu (2010–2013), Sarawak MLA for Bukit Assek (1996–2001, since 2006), brain cancer.
Bruno Zumino, 91, Italian particle physicist (CERN, UC-B), developed Wess-Zumino and WZW models, recipient of the Max Planck Medal (1989) and Humboldt Prize (1992).

22
Abdul Wahab Adam, 75, Ghanaian Islamic religious leader.
Fouad Ajami, 68, Lebanese-born American political scientist and author, prostate cancer.
Werner Biskup, 72, German footballer.
Felix Dennis, 67, British poet and publisher, founder of Dennis Publishing, throat cancer.
Rigoberto Guzmán, 82, Salvadoran football player and manager (national team), and teacher.
Teenie Hodges, 68, American rhythm and blues guitarist (Hi Rhythm Section) and songwriter ("Take Me to the River", "Love and Happiness"), complications from emphysema.
Matin Ahmed Khan, 93, Pakistani academic, Dean and Director of the Institute of Business Administration (1972–1977).
Grzegorz Knapp, 35, Polish speedway and ice speedway rider, race collision.
Washington Malianga, 88, Zimbabwean militant and political activist, founding member of ZANU and ZANLA.
Rama Narayanan, 65, Indian film director, producer and politician, Tamil Nadu MLA for Karaikudi (1989–1994), kidney failure.
Jennifer Wynne Reeves, 51, American painter, brain tumor.
Steve Rossi, 82, American comedian (Allen & Rossi), cancer.
Chuck Tatum, 87, American soldier, World War II Marine Iwo Jima combatant, provided source material for The Pacific.
Arif Valiyev, 70, Azerbaijani politician, Chairman of the State Statistics Committee (since 1993).

23
Hayford Akrofi, 60, Ghanaian politician and architect, shot.
Conrad Brann, 88, German linguist.
Quinton-Steele Botes, 54, Namibian sports administrator, multiple myeloma.
Małgorzata Braunek, 67, Polish actress (The Big Night Bathe), cancer.
Nancy Garden, 76, American writer (Annie on My Mind) and LGBT activist, heart attack.
Ichiro Komatsu, 63, Japanese civil servant and diplomat, Director-General of the Cabinet Legislation Bureau (2013–2014), Ambassador to France and Switzerland.
Lantra Fernando, 57, Sri Lankan cricketer.
Euros Lewis, 72, Welsh cricketer (Glamorgan, Sussex).
Michael K. Locke, 61, American politician, member of the Tennessee House of Representatives (2002), traffic collision.
Paula Kent Meehan, 82, American hair products executive, newspaper owner (Beverly Hills Courier) and philanthropist, co-founder of Redken.
Charles R. Moore, 79, American Methodist minister, suicide.
I. N. Murthy, 89, Indian film director.
Glen Percy, 85, American football coach (Ottawa University).
Steve Viksten, 53, American television writer and voice actor (Hey Arnold!, Rugrats), intracranial hemorrhage.
Magnus Wassén, 93, Swedish sailor, Olympic bronze medalist (1952).
Boris Yakovlev, 68, Ukrainian race walker.

24
Belfon Aboikoni, 74, Surinamese Saramaka chieftain.
Gladys Asmah, 74, Ghanaian politician.
Carlos F. Barbas III, 49, American biologist, cancer.
Sanedhip Bhimjee, 44, Mauritian dancer, pancreatic cancer.
John Clement, 85, Canadian politician, Ontario MPP for Niagara Falls (1971–1975).
Donald Allan Darling, 99, American statistician.
Jacqueline Jarrett Goodnow, 89, Australian cognitive psychologist.
Olga Kotelko, 95, Canadian athlete and book subject, intracranial brain hemorrhage.
Joachim Lambek, 91, German-born Canadian mathematician (Lambek–Moser theorem).
Lee McBee, 63, American blues musician.
Mary Ellen McCaffree, 96, American politician, member of the Washington House of Representatives (1963–1971).
Paolo Salvati, 75, Italian painter.
Richard Sharp, 67, American automotive retail and electronics executive, CEO of Circuit City (1986–2000), founder of CarMax, complications from Alzheimer's disease.
David Taylor, 60, Scottish lawyer, Chief Executive of the SFA, General Secretary of UEFA.
Ramón José Velásquez, 97, Venezuelan politician, Acting President (1993–1994).
Chip Wadena, 75, American Ojibwe tribal executive, Chairman of the White Earth Indian Reservation (1976–1996).
Eli Wallach, 98, American actor (The Good, the Bad and the Ugly, The Magnificent Seven, Baby Doll).
Johnnie Mac Walters, 94, American civil servant and lawyer, Commissioner of Internal Revenue (1971–1973).

25
Viktor Blažič, 85, Slovene journalist and dissident.
Hubert Bourdy, 57, French equestrian, Olympic bronze medalist (1988, 1992).
Salwa Bughaighis, 51, Libyan human rights activist, revolutionary and lawyer, member of the National Transitional Council, shot.
Nigel Calder, 82, British science writer (New Scientist) and television screenwriter, recipient of the Kalinga Prize (1972).
Hirut Desta, 84, Ethiopian royal.
Johnny Fantham, 75, English footballer (Sheffield Wednesday).
Derek Fielding, 84, Australian librarian and author.
Ragnhild Hilt, 68, Norwegian actress.
Sir Harry Hookway, 92, British civil servant, Chief Executive of the British Library (1973–1984).
Etta Hulme, 90, American editorial cartoonist (Fort Worth Star-Telegram).
Arvid Jacobsen, 75, Norwegian newspaper editor (Avisenes Nyhetsbyrå, Dagsavisen).
Ana María Matute, 88, Spanish writer, winner of the Miguel de Cervantes Prize (2010), heart attack.
James Rogers Miller, Jr., 83, American judge, member of the U.S. District Court for Maryland, heart failure.
A. C. Murali Mohan, 54, Indian actor, suicide by hanging.
Walter B. Parker, 87, American civil servant and policy advisor, investigated the Exxon Valdez oil spill.
Paul Patterson, 70, American neuroscientist and autism researcher, discovered further role of LIF in brain functioning.
Ivan Plyushch, 72, Ukrainian politician, Chairman of the Verkhovna Rada (1990, 1991–1994, 2000–2002), cancer.

26
Lidia Alexeyeva, 89, Russian basketball player and Hall of Fame coach (national team), Olympic champion team (1976, 1980).
Howard Baker, 88, American politician and diplomat, Senator from Tennessee (1967–1985), Senate Majority Leader (1981–1985), White House Chief of Staff (1987–1988), complications from a stroke.
Terry Blair, 67, American politician, member of the Ohio House of Representatives (since 2009).
Barry Cole, 77, British poet.
Bernard Etkin, 96, Canadian scientist.
Bill Frank, 76, American Hall of Fame CFL football player (Winnipeg Blue Bombers).
Ron Hall, 68, Australian NTFA football player (Scottsdale), heart attack.
Nina Hoekman, 49, Ukrainian-born Dutch draughts player and coach, breast cancer.
Rollin King, 83, American airline executive, co-founder of Southwest Airlines, complications from a stroke.
Wolf Koenig, 86, German-born Canadian filmmaker (Lonely Boy).
Bob Mischak, 81, American football player (New York Giants, New York Titans, Oakland Raiders).
Mary Rodgers, 83, American composer (Once Upon a Mattress) and children's author (Freaky Friday), heart ailment.
Julius Rudel, 93, Austrian-born American Grammy Award-winning conductor and director (New York City Opera, Buffalo Philharmonic Orchestra).
Vins, 70, Indian cartoonist.
Moacyr José Vitti, 73, Brazilian Roman Catholic prelate, Archbishop of Curitiba (since 2004), heart attack.

27
José Emilio Amores, 95, Mexican cultural promoter and teacher.
Gilbert Ashwell, 97, American biochemist and medical researcher, pneumonia.
Edmond Blanchard, 60, Canadian politician and judge, New Brunswick MLA for Campbellton, Chief Justice of the CMAC.
Fred Brown, 70, American politician, member of the Alaska House of Representatives (1974–1982).
Jim Bullions, 90, Scottish footballer.
John Dalgleish, 73, Australian footballer.
P. N. Furbank, 94, British writer and literary critic.
Miguel Ángel García Domínguez, 82, Mexican politician, MP (2003–2006).
Allen Grossman, 82, American poet (Bollingen Prize), complications from Alzheimer's disease.
Flor Hayes, 70, Irish Gaelic footballer (Cork).
Tymon Mabaleka, 65, Zimbabwean footballer (national team).
Amaro Macedo, 100, Brazilian botanist and plant collector.
Leslie Manigat, 83, Haitian politician, President (1988), complications from a stroke.
Bernard Ferdinand Popp, 96, American Roman Catholic prelate, Auxiliary Bishop of San Antonio (1983–1993).
Petter Schramm, 58, Norwegian poet.
Rachid Solh, 88, Lebanese politician, Prime Minister (1974–1975, 1992), MP for Beirut (1960–1974).
Rex Whitehead, 65, Australian cricket umpire, complications from a stroke.
Bobby Womack, 70, American Hall of Fame R&B singer ("Harry Hippie") and songwriter ("I Can Understand It").

28
Seymour Barab, 93, American composer and cellist.
Guido Boni, 80, Italian cyclist.
Jim Brosnan, 84, American baseball player (Cincinnati Reds, Chicago Cubs).
Joe Dooley, Irish hurler (Offaly).
Lois Geary, 84, American actress (The Last Stand, Silverado, The Astronaut Farmer).
Hedley Kett, 100, British World War II submariner.
Visitacao Lobo, 68, Indian footballer.
George Morrison, 86, American drama teacher.
Antonio José Ramírez Salaverría, 96, Venezuelan Roman Catholic prelate, Bishop of Maturín (1958–1994).
Jeffrey Ressner, 56, American entertainment journalist (Rolling Stone, Time, Politico), heart failure.
Brian Roe, 75, British cricketer (Somerset).
Hussein Shire, 85, Ugandan-born Somali transportation and agricultural executive.
Meshach Taylor, 67, American actor (Designing Women, Mannequin, Ned's Declassified School Survival Guide), colorectal cancer.

29
Maher Abd al-Rashid, 72, Iraqi army general.
Sixto Batista Santana, 82, Cuban military officer and politician.
Barbara Brunton, 86, Australian actress.
Damian D'Oliveira, 53, South African-born English cricketer (Worcestershire), cancer.
Sir John Freeland, 86, British diplomat and lawyer.
Dermot Healy, 66, Irish poet, novelist and playwright.
Paul Horn, 84, American Grammy Award-winning jazz and new age musician.
Abul Hussain, 91, Bangladeshi poet.
Don Matheson, 84, American actor (Falcon Crest, General Hospital, Land of the Giants), lung cancer.
Sir Cameron Moffat, 84, British Army officer and doctor, Director General Army Medical Services (1984–1987), Surgeon-General (1985–1987).
Robin Neill, 82, Canadian economic historian.
Walter Roberts, 97, Austrian-born American writer, lecturer, and government official.

30
Pierre Bec, 92, French Occitan language poet and linguist.
Danny Canning, 88, Welsh footballer (Swansea Town).
Frank Cashen, 88, American baseball executive (Baltimore Orioles, New York Mets), complications from heart failure.
Anton Cassar, 90, Maltese journalist, founder and first editor of L-Orizzont.
Bobby Castillo, 59, American baseball player (Los Angeles Dodgers, Minnesota Twins), cancer.
Sultanul Kabir Chowdhury, 68, freedom fighter, lawyer and politician, heart disease.
Álvaro Corcuera, 56, Mexican Roman Catholic priest, Director of the Legion of Christ (2005–2012), brain tumor.
Alejandra Da Passano, 66, Argentine actress.
Gustavo Dávila, 28, Colombian footballer, drowning.
Christian Führer, 71, German Protestant pastor and political activist, an organiser of the Monday demonstrations in East Germany, respiratory failure.
Tomás Galfrascoli, 88, Argentine Olympian
Bob Hastings, 89, American actor (McHale's Navy, The Munsters, Batman: The Animated Series), prostate cancer.
Richard Jencks, 93, American broadcasting executive, president of CBS Broadcast Group.
Kenny Kingston, 87, American psychic and variety show personality, cardiovascular disease.
Gianni Lancia, 89, Italian industrialist (Lancia).
Humberto Loayza, 88, Chilean Olympic boxer.
Piers Mackesy, 89, British historian.
Petero Mataca, 81, Fijian Roman Catholic prelate, Archbishop of Suva (1976–2012).
Matt's Scooter, 29, American Standardbred racehorse, euthanized.
Paul Mazursky, 84, American film director and screenwriter (An Unmarried Woman, Harry and Tonto, Moscow on the Hudson), pulmonary cardiac arrest.
Ed Messbarger, 82, American basketball coach (Angelo State Rams).
Peter Pragas, 87, Malaysian composer.
Jean-Pierre Renouard, 91, French writer, member of the Resistance.
Frank M. Robinson, 87, American science fiction writer (The Power) and speechwriter (Harvey Milk).
Maria Luisa Spaziani, 91, Italian poet.
Željko Šturanović, 54, Montenegrin politician, Prime Minister (2006–2008), lung cancer.
Hasan Tawfiq, 70, Egyptian poet and journalist.
Wei Shoukun, 106, Chinese metallurgist and physical chemist, Vice President of the University of Science and Technology Beijing.

References

2014-06
 06